Idisia is a genus of darkling beetles in the family Tenebrionidae. Idisia has at least one described species, I. ornata, found in the Palearctic.

References

Tenebrionoidea